The Women's 400 metre individual medley competition of the 2022 European Aquatics Championships was held on 13 August 2022.

Records
Prior to the competition, the existing world, European and championship records were as follows.

Results

Heats
The heats were started at 10:02

Final
The final was held at 19:28.

References

Women's 400 metre individual medley